Qamar (Arabic: قمر) is an Arabic name used both as a masculine and feminine, which means the "Moon", "natural satellite", "moonlight" -  a broader meaning is "brighter by the light of the moon".

Qamar may refer to:
  Khalil-ur-Rehman Qamar a Pakistani writer, director, lyricist and occasional actor
Maria Qamar, Pakistani-Canadian artist and author
  Qamar (Constitutional Loya Jirga, committee five) a delegate to Afghanistan's Constitutional Loya Jirga
 Qamar, Iran (disambiguation), places in Iran
 Qamar-ol-Moluk Vaziri

See also
Kamar (disambiguation)